Robert McNamara  (born 18 August 1987 in Southport, Queensland) is an Australian former figure skater. He competed at three Four Continents Championships and won the Australian national title in the 2009–10 season.

Programs

Competitive highlights
JGP: Junior Grand Prix

References

External links
 
 

Australian male single skaters
1987 births
Living people